Sana Yaakoubi (born 18 March 1995) is a Tunisian footballer who plays as a defender for AS Banque de l'Habitat and the Tunisia women's national team.

Club career
Yaakoubi has played for AS Banque de l'Habitat in Tunisia.

International career
Yaakoubi has capped for Tunisia at senior level, including in a 2–0 friendly away win over Jordan on 13 June 2021.

See also
List of Tunisia women's international footballers

References

External links

1995 births
Living people
Footballers from Tunis
Tunisian women's footballers
Women's association football defenders
Tunisia women's international footballers
20th-century Tunisian women
21st-century Tunisian women
Saudi Women's Premier League players